Cross Egypt Challenge (or simply CEC) is an annual cross-country endurance motorcycle and scooter rally conducted throughout the most difficult and challenging roads and tracks of Egypt. The rally is open to amateur and professional riders from around the globe.

The distance of the rally ranges between 2500 and 3000 km but with a different route every year. Participants usually ride from 200 to 500 km per day.

History 
Cross Egypt Challenge started in the year 2011 when one night in Alexandria, Ahmad Elzoghby, Founder of the Cross Egypt Challenge, was enjoying a normal evening with his cousins when one of them suggested they should take a trip to Sharm El Sheikh – on their scooters.

The idea of traveling to another city by scooter intrigued Elzoghby. Few days later, at another get together with his cousins, he proposed a daring idea. “I thought if we could go to Sharm Elsheikh, we could go anywhere else, scooter rallies are organised all over the world, but nothing like this had ever been done in Egypt. And there is no reason why we should not have an event like that here; we have the space, a beautiful country and great places to visit.”

The declining tourist numbers after the revolution worried Elzoghby and the Cross Egypt Challenge seemed a good idea to generate international media interest. “After the revolution, the global media focussed mainly on the problems Egypt was having, creating the impression that Egypt had stopped being safe,” he explained. “Yes, we are facing big challenges but for the most part Egypt is a safe place to be. I wanted to show the world that it is possible to travel across the country on a scooter and arrive safely.”

The international media loved the idea, and stories were carried by the likes of BBC, National Geographic and Discovery Channel. After the success of the challenge in its first year back in 2011, Elzoghby and his team decided that they would turn the Cross Egypt Challenge into an annual event.

2011 Edition 
The first season of Cross Egypt challenge took place between October 14 and 22, 2015, and was a 9 days ride from the shores of the Mediterranean Sea in the North of Egypt to the temple of Abu Simbel, on the southern borders of Egypt with a total distance of about 1700 km. 15 riders from 3 different countries took place in the 2011 season in which 14 were able to complete the challenge successfully.

The challenge began at the site of the modern Bibliotheca Alexandrina in the ancient city of Alexandria, passed by the Great Pyramids of Giza in Cairo, and crossed the Nile River and the Suez Canal on the way to the eastern Egyptian border at Taba. The riders head south to the cities of Neuwebaa and Dahab before reaching the world famous resort city of Sharm El Sheikh. They then took a ferry across the Gulf of Suez to Hurghada and continued their journey to the legendary city of Luxor; the world largest open-air museum, where they rode down the avenue of the sphinxes to reach the magnificent temple of Karnak. The team continued to Aswan and further south to end the journey in front of the most famous temple of Ramses II, Abu Simbel, on the shores of Lake Nasser.

2012 Edition
The 2012 season of Cross Egypt Challenge began on October 12, 2012 and lasted for 8 days. The season witnessed a 2400 km route starting from Egypt's capital and the home of the famous Tahrir Square, Cairo then head toward the coastal city of Alexandria before going west to the city of Marsa Matrouh. From Marsa Matrouh, the riders rode south and explored the most fascinating oases of the Egyptian Sahara; Siwa, Bahareya, Farafra, Dakhla and Kharga before arriving to the final destination, Luxor, the world's largest open-air museum.

The 2012 season had 25 riders 10 different countries. 24 in which were able to complete the challenge successfully.

2013 Edition
The 2013 season started on November 8, 2013 and lasted for 9 days. The total distance of the 2013 route was 2400 km and started from the Mediterranean city of Alexandria; passed by Egypt's capital, Cairo, made stops at the Western Desert Oases of Bahareya, Farafra, Dakhla, and Kharga, then head east towards Luxor, Hurghada, and Sokhna before ending the journey in Cairo at the foot of the Great Pyramids of Giza.

44 riders from 11 different countries took place in the 2013 season of Cross Egypt Challenge.

2014 Edition
The fourth season of Cross Egypt Challenge started on November 14, 2014 and lasted for 9 days. The 2014’s 3000 km route started from the Mediterranean city of Alexandria; passed by Egypt's capital, Cairo, made stops at Ain Sokhna, El Gouna, Marsa Alam before crossing the Egyptian Eastern Desert towards Luxor and Aswan, then made went deep south to Abu Simbel at the southern borders of Egypt before heading north by the Nile Valley towards Assiout and then ending the journey in Cairo under the Great Pyramids of Giza.

52 riders from 11 different countries took place in the 4th season of Cross Egypt Challenge, 48 of which were able to complete the challenge successfully.

2015 Edition
The 2015 and fifth anniversary season of Cross Egypt Challenge started on October 23, 2015 and lasted for 9 days. The 2,725 km route began from the Mediterranean's largest coastal city, Alexandria then passed through the Capital - Cairo - en route to the Red Sea's resort Sokhna before going South to visit the amazing resort cities of Sahl Hashish and Marsa Alam on the Red Sea shore. The challenge then headed west to the Nile valley to visit the ancient city of Luxor, the world's largest open-air museum city, and the capital of Ancient Egypt where the participants spent two days in celebration for the rally's 5th anniversary.
 
From Luxor the riders headed North-west to explore some of the most fascinating oasis of the Egyptian Sahara (desert). A total number of 3 oases were explored en route before the final leg of the 2015 season of Cross Egypt Challenge took place between Bahareya Oasis and Cairo to end the new season at the most sacred place in Egypt, under the Great Pyramids of Giza.

2016 Edition
The 2016 season of Cross Egypt Challenge returned back to the Egyptian western desert after 2 years of absence and included a 2,700 km route finished in 9 days.  The 2016 route Started from Alexandria at the shores of the Mediterranean Sea and went through the Egyptian western desert, the Nile valley, the Egyptian eastern desert and the Red Sea Riviera before heading back north and finishing the season in the most sacred place in Egypt, under the Great Pyramids of Giza

2017 Edition
The 2017 season of Cross Egypt Challenge featured a great route that span over 8 stages and 2,500 km. The 2017 route started from Alexandria and went through the Mediterranean coast, the Red Sea Riviera, Egyptian eastern desert, Egyptian western desert and the Nile valley before finishing the season in the most sacred place in Egypt, under the Great Pyramids of Giza.

2018 Edition
The 2018 season of Cross Egypt Challenge featured a fantastic route that span over 7 stages and 2,475 km. The 2018 route started from Alexandria and went through the Mediterranean coast, the Red Sea Riviera, Egyptian eastern desert, Egyptian western desert and the Nile valley before finishing the season in the most sacred place in Egypt, under the Great Pyramids of Giza.

2019 Edition
The 2019 season of Cross Egypt Challenge featured a fantastic route that span over 7 stages and 2,320 km. The 2019 route started from Alexandria and went through the Mediterranean coast, the Nile Valley, Egyptian eastern deserts, and the Red Sea Riviera before finishing the season in the most sacred place in Egypt, under the Great Pyramids of Giza.
 

Cross Egypt Challenge is considered the only organized cross-country rally of its kind in the entire region and combines the best of adventure travel and extreme sport. Each season of the endurance rally introduces a new route throughout the most famous spots of Egypt. Tens of adventure riders fly to Egypt yearly to take part of the famous challenge.

List of participants

2011 participants

2012 participants

2013 participants

2014 participants

2015 participants

2016 participants

2017 participants

2018 participants

2019 participants

Television coverage 

 October 2011: Aljazeera Documentary Channel  produced a full-length documentary about the first season of Cross Egypt Challenge. However, due to production issues at the channel, the movie was aired in June 2014. The film crew followed the riders of the first season as they travelled through Egypt on their scooters and documented their journey from day to day and from town to town. Link to the full movie: https://www.youtube.com/watch?v=QHEljtydvpE
 September 2011: National Geographic radio  conducted a radio interview with Ahmad Elzoghby of Cross Egypt Challenge to speak about the initiative and what their plans for the future are. Link to the full episode: https://web.archive.org/web/20150810163427/http://radio.nationalgeographic.com/radio/ng-weekend-archives/1139/
 November 2014: Egyptian TV station CBC broadcast a short documentary about the 2014 season of Cross Egypt Challenge Link to the documentary: https://www.youtube.com/watch?v=RonYqHddY3w
 December 2014: Interview with Ahmad Elzoghby, founder of Cross Egypt Challenge to speak about the recently finished 2014 season of Cross Egypt Challenge on Sabah ON morning show on Egyptian TV station OnTV. Link to the interview: https://www.youtube.com/watch?v=qDG50FrJmdw
 February 2015: Famous Egyptian sport program "Doos Banzeen" on Mehwar Channel dedicated an episode about the 2014 season of Cross Egypt Challenge. Link to the episode: https://www.youtube.com/watch?v=mYAgaDirv0o

Incidents

References

External links 
 Website www.crossegyptchallenge.com
 Facebook www.facebook.com/crossegyptchallenge
 Twitter www.twitter.com/crossegypt
 YouTube www.youtube.com/crossegyptchallenge
 Instagram www.instagram.com/crossegyptchallenge

2011 establishments in Egypt
Recurring sporting events established in 2011
Rally raid races
Motorsport in Egypt
Sports competitions in Egypt
Abu Simbel